State Route 417 (SR 417), also known as W Ellington Parkway, is a short  north-south state highway located entirely in the city of Lewisburg, Tennessee.

Route description

SR 417 begins at an intersection with SR 373 (Mooresville Highway/W Commerce Street) in the western part of the city. It heads north through wooded areas before curving to the northeast and passing through suburban areas, where it passes by Marshall County High School and Lewisburg Middle School. The highway curves to the east to pass by Westhills Elementary School before it comes to an end at an intersection with US 431 (N Ellington Parkway/SR 50/SR 106). The entire route of SR 417 is a two-lane highway.

Major intersections

References

417
Transportation in Marshall County, Tennessee